Pennville can refer to a place:

In the United States
Pennville, Indiana, in Jay County
Pennville, Wayne County, Indiana
Pennville, Georgia
Pennville, Missouri
Pennville, Pennsylvania

Elsewhere
Pennville, Dominica